St. Petersburg, Florida, held a general election for mayor on August 29 and November 7, 2017, with a primary election which took place on August 29, 2017. Incumbent mayor Rick Kriseman, a Democrat, opted to seek re-election. His opponent in the runoff was Republican former mayor Rick Baker (2001–2010). The election was officially non-partisan.

Incumbent Rick Kriseman won re-election.

Background 
In the 2013 election, then incumbent mayor Bill Foster opted to seek re-election for that year's mayoral election. With no candidates having a majority in the primary election, Foster and former Florida House of Representatives member Rick Kriseman faced off in the general election, where Kriseman was elected on November 5, 2013, by a 10 point margin. He assumed office on January 2, 2014.

Candidates

Declared 
In December 2016, advocate and singer-songwriter Paul Congemi announced his bid for mayor. In January 2017, current incumbent mayor Rick Kriseman filed for re-election. In March 2017, African People's Socialist Party activist Jesse Nevel filed for election, as well as Anthony Cates II, a salesman. In May 2017, former St. Petersburg mayor Rick Baker filed for re-election, and Ernisa Barnwell. In June 2017, activist Theresa Lassiter announced her bid for mayoral office.

Polling

Primary campaigns 
Seven candidates ended up filing for the mayoral office before the cut-off date on June 23. The front-runners include the incumbent mayor Kriseman and former mayor Baker, with minor candidates including Nevel, Lassiter, Cates, Congemi, and Barnwell. 

At the start of each campaign, Kriseman focused on the continuation of progress which included financing and construction of a new police headquarters and St. Petersburg Pier, poverty, and keeping the Tampa Bay Rays in the city. Baker aimed to win voters with his past management reputation, rebuilding the Sundial, and the Major League Soccer bid for the Tampa Bay Rowdies. Minor candidates such as Nevel and Lassiter vowed to focus on poverty and on St. Petersburg's southern historical black community. 

Upon announcement of his re-election bid, Kriseman received endorsements from congressman Charlie Crist, U.S. senator Bill Nelson, the Sun Coast Police Benevolent Association, and four city council members in March.

On June 27, Kriseman and Baker participated in a debate which centered on local issues and questions as well as past campaigns.

On July 10, Barnwell was disqualified from the race due to a bounced check upon applying for candidacy. On the same day, the second public mayoral debate was held between both major candidates—Kriseman and Baker—and minor candidates—Nevel, Lassiter, Cates, Congemi, and Barnwell—on issues involving the economy is south St. Petersburg, the police department, and homelessness before being halted by protesters. In the latter, mayoral candidate Congemi went viral after a comment he made on July 18 during a mayoral forum towards another mayoral candidate Nevel and his supporters.

On August 9, Ernisa Barnwell was officially disqualified from the mayoral race after a judge dismissed her injunction.

Throughout the primary election, Baker had been endorsed by the Tampa Bay Times, various pastors in St. Petersburg, as well as realtors. In August, Kriseman was endorsed by Barack Obama.

Polling

Primary results
Kriseman and Baker obtained the most votes of any the candidates during the August 29 primary and both will advance a second election on November 7 as neither got the majority vote needed to avoid a runoff election. The day after the primary took place, it was reported Kriseman took 48.36 percent of the vote, or 27,322 votes with all 92 precincts reporting. Baker, a former two-term mayor, won 27,253 or 48.23 percent. Kriseman's win in the actual primary vote was unexpected, since opinions polls conducted before the election showed Baker with not only a wide lead, but enough potential to win over enough voters needed to cross the more than 50 percent majority threshold; at his post-election party, Baker had also given a speech claiming prematurely that he had won the primary as well.

General election 
At the beginning of the general election on September 6, both Kriseman and Baker temporarily suspended their campaigns to prepare for Hurricane Irma.

References 

21st century in St. Petersburg, Florida
St. Petersburg
Mayoral elections in St. Petersburg, Florida
St. Petersburg, Florida
St. Petersburg